Sir William Pulteney (25 March 1624 – 6 September 1691) was an English Member of Parliament.

He represented Westminster from February 1679 to March 1681 and then from January 1689 until his death.

His children included:
 Colonel William Pulteney (died 1715), father of William Pulteney, 1st Earl of Bath and Harry Pulteney
 John Pulteney (died 1726), father of Daniel Pulteney and grandfather of Laura Pulteney, 1st Countess of Bath
 Anne Pulteney (died 1746), who married Charles FitzRoy, 2nd Duke of Cleveland; their great-grandson William Vane, 1st Duke of Cleveland was the eventual heir to the Pulteney estates in Bath.

References
 
 http://thepeerage.com/p10841.htm#i108410

1624 births
1691 deaths
English MPs 1679
English MPs 1680–1681
English MPs 1689–1690
English MPs 1690–1695